

Regular season

Relegation playoffs

Gijón Baloncesto and Festina Andorra, relegated to LEB.

Championship Playoffs

See also
 Liga ACB

External links
 ACB.com 
 linguasport.com 

Liga ACB seasons
   
Spain